Turnipseed is a surname. Notable people with the surname include:

Erica Simone Turnipseed (born 1971), American author
Tom Turnipseed (1936–2020), American politician and activist
Roy B. Turnipseed, Marine, Private First Class of Fox Company, Second Battalion, Seventh Marine Regiment during Nov-Dec 1950, a regiment and company known for holding Fox Hill in Dec 1950 during the Korean Conflict.

Fictional people
Harold and Martha Turnipseed, characters in the video game Destroy All Humans!
Adrian Turnipseed, a character in the Unseen University in books by Terry Pratchett

See also
 Donald Turnupseed, driver involved in the death of James Dean